Elevenplay is a Japanese dance troupe noted for their incorporation of advanced technologies into their works. It is headed by director and principal choreographer Mikiko.

Performances
The collaborated with the Rhizomatics groups to produce a piece called Shadow, which also uses three drones as well as one spot light and one dancer. Elevenplay teamed up with the Rhizomatiks again to produce the show Pulse, for the Festival Internacional Cervantino in Mexico. This piece relies on projection-mapping both on the background and on the dancers.

They have also collaborated individually with Rhizomatics director Daito Manabe to create a technology-enhanced show called Drone-Augmented Amazingness, which uses three drones as well as a projection-mapped backdrop.  At first, the dancers direct the drones, but by the end of the piece, the drones replace the dancers.

Members 
 KOHMEN
 Saya Shinohara
 Emi Tamura
 Yu Tokutake
 NON
 Minako Maruyama
 Kaori Yasukawa
 Erisa Wakisaka
 Shoko Akiyama

Former members 
 TOMO (Tomomi Yoshimura) - choreographer and dancer
 Arisa Iwasawa
 Saori Oodan
 Nanako Sudo
 Kazune Tomita
 Aayane Nakamoto
 Mayumi Niwa
 Yuka Numata
 Nozomi Hiramoto/Okamoto
 Asami Horiko
 Konomi Masuda
 Mariko Yoshino
 Mai Kuremoto

External links
 Daito Manabe website
 AM.com Mexico
 Sonarsound Japan
 Home page for Mikiko (in Japanese)

References

Dance companies